Alberto Anchart (24 September 1931 – 31 October 2011) was an Argentine actor. He appeared in more than 20 films and television shows between 1954 and 2008. He died on 31 October 2011.

Selected filmography
 Venga a bailar el Rock (1957)
 La Casa de Madame Lulù (1968)
 Amigos para La Aventura (1978)
 Cuatro pícaros bomberos (1979)
 The Notice of the Day (2001)

References

External links

1931 births
2011 deaths
Argentine male film actors
Burials at La Chacarita Cemetery
People from Buenos Aires